Palanca is a village in Ștefan Vodă District, Moldova, near the border with Ukraine. Situated at a longitude of 30°06' east, it is the country's easternmost point and lowest point.

Border dispute
Among the most sensitive areas of the Moldova–Ukraine relations is the crossing point at Palanca. The demarcation process took many years. In 2010 Deputy Foreign Minister of Moldova Andrei Popov stated  that land in Palanca was an inseparable part of the Moldovan territory and would not be ceded to Ukraine. However, on November 22, 2012, the Moldovan ambassador to Ukraine announced that Moldova had transferred the section of the road by Palanca and that it had become property of Ukraine within the territory of Moldova, which would be controlled by Ukraine.

Notable people
 Gheorghe Ghidirim

See also
 Extreme points of Moldova

References

Villages of Ștefan Vodă District
Extreme points of Moldova
Populated places on the Dniester
Moldova–Ukraine border